The modern numerical digit 0 is usually written as a circle, an ellipse, or a rounded rectangle.

Glyphs

In most modern typefaces, the height of the 0 character is the same as the other digits. However, in typefaces with text figures, the character is often shorter (x-height).

Traditionally, many print typefaces made the capital letter O more rounded than the narrower, elliptical digit 0. Typewriters originally made no distinction in shape between O and 0; some models did not even have a separate key for the digit 0. The distinction came into prominence on modern character displays.

The digit 0 with a dot in the centre seems to have originated as an option on IBM 3270 displays. Its appearance has continued with Taligent's command line typeface Andalé Mono. One variation used a short vertical bar instead of the dot. This could be confused with the Greek letter Theta on a badly focused display, but in practice there was no confusion because theta was not (then) a displayable character and very little used anyway.

An alternative, the slashed zero (looking similar to the letter O except for the slash), was primarily used in hand-written coding sheets before transcription to punched cards or tape, and is also used in old-style ASCII graphic sets descended from the default typewheel on the Teletype Model 33 ASR. This form is similar to the symbol , or "∅" (Unicode character U+2205), representing the empty set, as well as to the letter Ø used in several Scandinavian languages. Some Burroughs/Unisys equipment displays a digit 0 with a reversed slash.

The opposing convention that has the letter O with a slash and the digit 0 without was advocated by SHARE, a prominent IBM user group, and recommended by IBM for writing FORTRAN programs, and by a few other early mainframe makers; this is even more problematic for Scandinavians because it means two of their letters collide. Others advocated the opposite convention, including IBM for writing Algol programs. Another convention used on some early line printers left digit 0 unornamented but added a tail or hook to the capital O so that it resembled an inverted Q (like U+213A ℺) or cursive capital letter-O.

Some fonts designed for use with computers made one of the capital-O–digit-0 pair more rounded and the other more angular (closer to a rectangle). The TI-99/4A computer has a more angular capital O and a more rounded digit 0, whereas others made the choice the other way around.

The typeface used on most European vehicle registration plates distinguishes the two symbols partially in this manner (having a more rectangular or wider shape for the capital O than the digit 0), but in several countries a further distinction is made by slitting open the digit 0 on the upper right side (as in German plates using the fälschungserschwerende Schrift, "forgery-impeding typeface").

Sometimes the digit 0 is used either exclusively, or not at all, to avoid confusion altogether. For example, confirmation numbers used by Southwest Airlines use only the capital letters O and I instead of the digits 0 and 1, while Canadian postal codes use only the digits 1 and 0 and never the capital letters O and I, although letters and numbers always alternate.

Other

On the seven-segment displays of calculators, watches, and household appliances, 0 is usually written with six line segments, though on some historical calculator models it was written with four line segments.

The international maritime signal flag has five plus signs in an X arrangement.

Zero symbols in Unicode

See also

Ø (disambiguation)

References

0 (number)
Mathematical symbols